Felix von Manteuffel (born Friedrich Karl Baron von Manteuffel-Szoege 6 May 1945) is a German actor.

Manteuffel was born in Bayrischzell to a family of Baltic-German origin. He visited an actors school in Munich in 1967-70 and first appeared on a stage in 1969 in Bertolt Brecht's Die Ausnahme und die Regel at the Munich Kammerspiele and became a member of the Kammerspiele ensemble in 1972 (until 1984).

He appeared at several German stages like the theater Ulm, the Schauspiel Köln,  Deutsches Schauspielhaus (Hamburg),  Bayerisches Staatsschauspiel (Munich) and is a well-known TV-actor.

Manteuffel has been married to the actress Leslie Malton since 1995.

Awards
 Adolf Grimme Awards (1976)

Filmography

References

External links
 
 

1945 births
Living people
People from Miesbach (district)
Baltic-German people
German male stage actors